Song Dong-hwan (born February 4, 1980, in Seoul, South Korea) is a retired professional ice hockey player. Nicknamed "Asian Rocket", he won the scoring title with 31 goals in the 2005-2006 regular season for Asia League Ice Hockey. Song was the first Korean player to do so. Song spent his entire professional career in Asia League Ice Hockey.

Song was originally drafted by 'Dong-Won Dreams' (the club operation folded in 1998 from IMF Asia crises) 1st overall. He won the Rookie of the year trophy, Best6, 10-10 club. After the Dong-Won Dreams closed their operation, he signed with Anyang Halla in 2003, where he played 3 seasons from 2003 to 2006 before taking a leave of absence from hockey to serve his 2-year mandatory service in the South Korean military. Song returned to hockey in 2008 to play for Anyang Halla for another 3 seasons. Song played a lone season for the Japanese team Nikko Icebucks in 2011-12 before playing his final 4 seasons for Japanese team High1 from 2012 through 2016.

He started playing hockey when he was grade 4, the former Korea University forward won the scoring title and was voted as MVP for 99-00' Korean League. He also led the team to the championship title for 01-02' season.

Career highlights
During a 1998 junior international game against Thailand, Song scored a record 31 goals in Korea's 92-0 victory. This feat was commemorated by the Hockey Hall of Fame in Toronto, where his game jersey was displayed.

99-00' season MVP, Point leader

01-02' Won the Championship title with Korea University

02-03' signed with Dong Won Club, MVP, Best 6

03-04' Signed with Anyang Halla, played in Asia League All Star game (4 Goals), MVP

05-06' 38 games, 31G 31A 62 pts

2006 won the AL scoring

Career statistics

References

External links 

High1 Official Homepage

1980 births
Living people
Ice hockey people from Seoul
South Korean ice hockey right wingers
HL Anyang players
High1 players
Nikkō Ice Bucks players
Ice hockey players at the 2003 Asian Winter Games
Ice hockey players at the 2011 Asian Winter Games
Medalists at the 2011 Asian Winter Games
Asian Games bronze medalists for South Korea
Asian Games medalists in ice hockey
Competitors at the 2001 Winter Universiade